The Albacete helicopter plant is a manufacturing site in the spanish city of Albacete, and was the first helicopter manufacturing site in the country.

History
Eurocopter was formed in 1992, and in 2009 became the world's largest helicopter company.

The new factory was started in May 2005, to produce the EC135 and TIGER helicopters. 

The site was opened on 28 March 2007.
The site was visited by the King of Spain in April 2010.

In November 2010 the site made its first EC135 for the UME (Military Emergencies Unit). This was the first time that a helicopter had been completely made in Spain.

Structure
The site has around 600 employees. It assembles helicopters.

See also
 Marignane Airport in France

References

External links
 Airbus in Spain

Buildings and structures in Albacete
Companies based in Castilla–La Mancha
Manufacturing plants in Spain